Gay Kayler (born 27 September 1941), is an Australian country music entertainer - a vocalist, television personality, recording artist, pianist, triple beauty quest title holder, model, scriptwriter and educator. Gay used her maiden name in her professional career until 1978, when she changed the spelling from Kahler to Kayler to maintain a consistency of pronunciation. She retired in 1998.

Early life
Gay comes from a musical family. Her mother sang and played piano, piano accordion and violin with her siblings in their father's dance band on the Darling Downs, Queensland, in the 1930s.

In 1942, the Kahler family moved to Sydney, where Gay continued this musical tradition when, at the age of two-and-a-half, she captivated commuters on Sydney's trams and buses as she sang for them.

In the early 1950s, Gay sang on one of the first reel-to-reel tape recorders in Australia – as part of its demonstration at the Sydney Royal Easter Show.

After attaining her certificate for 7th Grade Piano, Theory and Musical Perception, Gay and her family moved to Toowoomba, Queensland. It was there that Gay made her first professional performance in 1958.

Gay's reputation blossomed when she was chosen to sing the Alexandra Waltz for Princess Alexandra during her 1959 visit to Australia. The Fairy Princess wanted to hear more so, by royal command, the teenager sang a selection of songs. Ultimately, this led to Gay being contracted to Brisbane's Channel 7 for 3 years, where she appeared in shows such as the multi-Logie-Award-winning Theatre Royal with George Wallace Jnr.

Television and live performances 
Gay Kayler's 40-year professional showbusiness career included appearances on most national TV shows, e.g. Brian Henderson's Bandstand, Johnny O'Keefe's Sing, Sing, Sing and Graeme Bell's Trad Jazz. She performed eight times in the main Concert Hall of the Sydney Opera House, including on the first all-Australian Country Music Concert and the first all-Australian Variety Show held in that iconic venue. Gay also featured her Salvation Army Red Shield Appeal Song, Captain Joe Henry's Happy Hand-Clapping, Open Air Rhythm Band, backed by a 300-voice choir and huge Salvation Army band, when she opened and closed a 1976 concert in that venue.

Other notable venues included Melbourne's Sidney Myer Music Bowl, Adelaide's Chrysler Auditorium and the 1,500 strong NSW Registered Club Circuit, said to be the biggest entertainment circuit in the world in its day.

Modelling, commercials and movie sound track

Gay Kayler, a triple beauty quest title holder, was a singer and model who also made commercials, e.g., with Bert Newton on Australia's Great Barrier Reef and the female voices on the radio commercial, David Callan at Your Club, which was aired over 31,000 times. She recorded the female sound track on the 1978 Little Boy Lost movie, which was released worldwide. Terry Bourke, the movie's director, presented an autographed copy of Little Boy Lost, a book based on his screenplay, to Gay Kayler at the movie premiere. The Little Boy Lost DVD was released in 2005 and again in 2007.

Recordings 
Gay's recording career began in 1973 when she recorded the EMI album, Faces of Love, with Johnny Ashcroft. She had a double charting single in 1975 of "Nobody's Child" coupled with the first Australian female trucking song, "My Home-Coming Trucker's Coming Home", composed by Ashcroft. She was chosen to record Ruth Cotton's Dream Away My Life, an RCA/2KY Country Songwriter prize-winner. Her last recording in 1995 was "Child of Koonapippi", a song of the Aboriginal Stolen Generations, written by Eric Watson (re-released 2001). 

Gay is best known for her version of The White Magnolia Tree, which was in EMI and Reader's Digest catalogues for over 33 years; also for her work on the heritage LP, The Cross of the Five Silver Stars – in particular for Matthew, a song of the great navigator, Matthew Flinders. This album was a finalist for the Heritage Award in the Australasian Country Music Awards. It was re-released as part of the 2007 Rajon Music Australian historical double CD set, Johnny Ashcroft, Here's To You, Australia!<ref>http://johnnyashcroft.com.au/ Here's To You Australia Reviews, A Passionate Heritage by John E Minson AM Country Music Capital News, October 1987</ref> It also features Bettybo and musical director, Shep Davis.

Albums

Singles

 Production shows 
Gay Kayler combined a major part of her career with Australian country music star, Johnny Ashcroft, whom she married in 1981.  Although they created a reputation as a show-stopping duo, they still retained their individuality by incorporating solo highlights within their performances.

Their production shows, such as The Imagine That! Australiana Show, Here's To You, Australia!, The Goodtime Gotcha Show and Everything But The Drover's Dog, often included comedy segments with Gay and Johnny as themselves, and also as their alter egos, The Baron and Lady Finflingkington (The Baron's consort), who sang disco.

Parallel with their adult production shows, Gay Kayler and Johnny Ashcroft spent eleven years presenting Australian history to more than 750,000 school children with songs, stories and visuals in their NSW Education Department accredited shows.

In 2004, Gay and Johnny were adopted into the Gamilaraay Nation by Gamilaraay elder, Centennial Medal holder and United Nations keynote speaker, Barbara Flick, because of their 'ground-breaking' presentations of Australia's First Nations people, both traditional and present day, and for their stance against racism.thumb|Gay Kayler in the Australian Country Music Hands of Fame

Special Recognition
In 1981, Gay Kayler received the Queensland Country Music Awards national trophy for Service to Australia's Country Music Industry.

Gay Kayler was imprinted in the Australian Country Music Hands of Fame in 1994.

LegacyThe Johnny Ashcroft and Gay Kayler Legacy Collection was presented to the Australian Country Music Hall of Fame in Tamworth (Gamilaraay Country) on 28 May 2022, with a Welcome to Country and Smoking Ceremony.

Nine Hundred and seventy-seven items, plus seventy-nine recordings, a variety of posters and eighteen recorded backgrounds joined their artefacts already in the Museum. Little Boy Lost, the Search, Song, Movie and Beyond (one hundred and three items) was part of this impressive Collection. Tamworth Regional Council news article

 Credits and awards 
(Chronological):

Royal Command Performance for Princess Alexandra, the Queen's cousin
Miss Australia Quest's Miss Darling DownsSunday Mail's Kirra Sun GirlRSL Western Districts Girl in a MillionInaugural President of the Toowoomba Bachelor Girls' Service Club Salvation Army Red Shield Appeal Song (Captain Joe Henry's Happy Hand-Clapping Open Air Rhythm Band)
Inaugural Secretary of the Professional Country Music Association of Australia (PCMAA)
Finalist in Best Female category (Australasian Country Music Awards)
Finalist in Best Duo – with Johnny Ashcroft (Australasian Country Music Awards)
National Award for Service to Australia's Country Music Industry (Queensland Country Music Awards)
Finalist for the Heritage Award with The Cross of the Five Silver Stars (Australasian Country Music Awards)
Multiple nominee in the Australian Variety Artists Mo Awards
Imprinted in the Australasian Country Music Hands of Fame''–Tamworth, New South Wales

References

External links 
 
 Johnny Ashcroft
 The Australian Country Music Hands of Fame
 Gay Kayler recordings in National Film & Sound Archives
 Gay Kahler recordings in National Film & Sound Archives
 1961 Theatre Royal Cast
 Tamworth Capital News Editorial
 Oral History in National Film & Sound Archive
Tim Cox, ABC Hobart, re Johnny Ashcroft & Gay Kayler for Little Boy Lost 50th Anniversary 11 Feb 2010

Living people
Australian country singers
Australian women singers
1941 births